Williamson is a census-designated place (CDP) in Yavapai County, Arizona, United States. The population was 3,776 at the 2000 census.  The name "Wiliamson" is a misnomer, perhaps propagated by federal bureaucratic error; the area has long been known as "Williamson Valley" after the major road through the area, Williamson Valley Road.

Geography

Williamson is located at  (34.674552, -112.530445).

An attempt in 2009 to incorporate the area into a town failed after the neighboring town of Prescott voted against the proposal.

Demographics

At the 2000 census there were 3,776 people, 1,558 households, and 1,266 families in the CDP. The racial makeup of the CDP was 96.9% White, 0.1% Black or African American, 0.4% Native American, 0.3% Asian, 0.1% Pacific Islander, 0.8% from other races, and 1.4% from two or more races.  3.5% of the population were Hispanic or Latino of any race.
Of the 1,558 households 20.9% had children under the age of 18 living with them, 74.8% were married couples living together, 4.4% had a female householder with no husband present, and 18.7% were non-families. 14.2% of households were one person and 5.1% were one person aged 65 or older.  The average household size was 2.42 and the average family size was 2.65.

The age distribution was 17.7% under the age of 18, 3.8% from 18 to 24, 17.1% from 25 to 44, 41.3% from 45 to 64, and 20.1% 65 or older.  The median age was 51 years. For every 100 females, there were 96.8 males.  For every 100 females age 18 and over, there were 95.8 males.

The median household income was $47,182 and the median family income  was $51,983. Males had a median income of $40,189 versus $26,500 for females. The per capita income for the CDP was $30,232.  About 3.6% of families and 5.3% of the population were below the poverty line, including 7.1% of those under age 18 and 1.5% of those age 65 or over.

References

Census-designated places in Yavapai County, Arizona
Census-designated places in Arizona